Benzphenone-1 – benzophenone-12 (BP-1 –BP-12) are UVA/UVB absorbers. Some of them are used in sunscreens.

Benzophenone-1 (2,4-dihydroxybenzophenone)
Benzophenone-2 (2,2',4,4'-tetrahydroxybenzophenone)
Benzophenone-3 (oxybenzone)
Benzophenone-4 (sulisobenzone)
Benzophenone-5 (sulisobenzone sodium)
Benzophenone-6 (2,2'-dihydroxy-4,4'-dimethoxybenzophenone)
Benzophenone-7 (5-chloro-2-hydroxybenzophenone)
Benzophenone-8 (dioxybenzone)
Benzophenone-9 (sodium 2,2'-dihydroxy-4,4'-dimethoxybenzophenone-5,5'-disulfonate)
Benzophenone-10 (mexenone, 2-hydroxy-4-methoxy-4'-methyl-benzophenone)
Benzophenone-11 (benzophenone-2 and benzophenone-6)
Benzophenone-12 (octabenzone, used to protect plastics)

References
 Chemicalland21: Benzophenone

Sunscreening agents
Benzophenones